Srđevići is a village in the municipality of Gacko, Republika Srpska, Bosnia and Herzegovina,Most famous person from here is Stojan Kovacevic.

References

Villages in Republika Srpska
Populated places in Gacko